Pullambil Sankaran Mooppan was an ancient chief commander of the Pazhassi Raja. The pullambil Moopan's Thiyyar family of thellichery and the families vazhayil moopan and vamala moopan too seem to have engaged in sea trade on an extantion scale.

East India Company War
Malabar was in the Madras Presidency. In Malabar, there was conflict with local rulers who resisted the British. One of the rulers was Kerala Varma Pazhassi Raja from the Kotayam family. The conflict and subsequent revolt was due to an unreasonable revenue policy, and it lasted from 1796 to 1805. British tried to overcome the forces of Pazhassi Raja. During the conflict, Thiyya leaders helped Raja of Pazhassi. Sankaran Mooppan of Pullambil Theravadu, a famous Thiyya family, was Pazhassi Raja's commander. The sword used by the commander is still in the house today. The sword is unique in that it is straight and pointed, resembling the European style and not the curved configuration of the Persian style used by the Mughal army. Many Thiyya warriors sacrificed their lives during the battle with the British. Under the command of Sankaran, Raja's forces attacked British posts and prevented the capture of the king.
 
But the British forces led by Colonel Stevenson were using  modern weapons and had superior soldiers, and they circled Raja's army with swords and spears. Raja and his men retreated, and the force escaped into the jungle. Raja was later killed on November 30, 1805. Commander Sankaran and his army were no match to the mighty British army. All were killed. Gradually the resistance from the provincial rulers diminished, and the British army took full control of Malabar. Home In the Pullambil house, the historical gallantry of commander Sankaran still echoes in the walls of the Theravadu. A tomb was built in honor of the great Pazhassi Raia in Manandavady.

Home 
Sanakaran Moopan lived in Pullambil Tharavad, near Thalassery in southwestern India. His home had a rich history going back three to four centuries. The property had an imposing entrance from Pullambil road, leading to the house via a long driveway (about 200 feet long). The front entrance of the house opened to the court yard and was surrounded by an arched veranda on four sides. A stone floor in the boundary was used to spread grains. Tall ebony pillars supported the roof. The veranda led to magnificent reception rooms with stone flooring.

References

18th-century Indian people
Year of birth unknown
Year of death unknown
Cotiote War
Thalassery
Military history of India
Indian military personnel
Thiyyar warriors